The 2014 Toronto FC season was the eighth season in club history. During the off-season, Toronto FC agreed to a one-year partnership with USL outfit Wilmington Hammerheads. Jackson, Justin Morrow, Dwayne De Rosario, Gilberto, Michael Bradley, Jermain Defoe, Bradley Orr, Collen Warner, Luke Moore, Dominic Oduro, Warren Creavalle and Júlio César came to Toronto.

Toronto opened pre-season on January 24. Toronto will start the season on March 15 against the Seattle Sounders FC and finish on October 25 against the New England Revolution.

Background

Background information

During the 2013 season, Toronto FC finished second from bottom of the Eastern Conference. They had finished 19th out of 19 teams in the 2012 season. Toronto held off renewal of season tickets "months later than normal — hoping that off-season moves have given ticket-holders a reason to get back on board."  Toronto FC agreed to a one-year partnership with USL outfit Wilmington Hammerheads on January 22. In the deal, will receive a minimum of four Toronto FC reserve team players. Also included in the deal is invitation for the Wilmington Hammerheads to attend the club's pre–season training camp in Florida, the club's coaching curriculum, and an MLS club's professional environment which includes a business relationship and a friendly.

During the off-season, Toronto acquired Jackson, Issey Nakajima-Farran,  Justin Morrow, and Dwayne De Rosario. Gilberto signed as a designated player. Gilberto had "turned down deals in Mexico, Germany, and other countries." In addition to Gilberto, Michael Bradley and Jermain Defoe joined the club as designated players. Defoe was due to join Toronto on February 28 from Tottenham Hotspur. However, Defoe didn't join Toronto until March 9 due to International duty with England. Bradley Orr and Júlio César joined Toronto on loan.

The options on Gale Agbossoumonde, Joe Bendik, Mark Bloom, Bright Dike, Jeremy Hall, Chris Konopka, Reggie Lambe, Ryan Richter, Quillan Roberts, Emery Welshman, and Andrew Wiedeman were exercised. Joe Bendik signed a new contract. Greg Vanney was hired as Assistant General Manager and the Academy Director on December 11.

Tim Bezbatchenko confirmed that Darel Russell, Michael Thomas, Stefan Frei, Justin Braun, and Danny Koevermans would not return to the club in 2014 after their contracts expired or their options were declined. The right to sign Stefan Frei was traded to the Seattle Sounders FC. Stefan Frei was the longest-serving player at the club at the time of the trade. Richard Eckersley and Matías Laba were traded. Jonas Elmer and Toronto FC "mutually agreed to part ways." Emery Welshman and Reggie Lambe were placed on waivers.

Robert Earnshaw and Bobby Convey

Robert Earnshaw and Bobby Convey options were also declined. Bobby Convey had expected to return to the club. However, Toronto FC General Manager Tim Bezbatchenko stated that he wanted Bobby Convey back at the club and stated that he "could be an important piece." The club are "attempting to make the veteran's salary cap hit match his on-field production." Tim Bezbatchenko also stated that he wanted Robert Earnshaw back at the club. The rights to Bobby Convey were traded to the New York Red Bulls.

Designated player search

The club was in the process of a "lengthy search" for a "marquee-designated player". MLSE President Tim Leiweke, Club General Manager Tim Bezbatchenko, and Head Coach Ryan Nelsen traveled to Europe in October 2013 to search for such a player. Leiweke was quoted, stating, that "the days of us putting our toe in the water and trying to find a cheap DP (designated player) are over. We're going to go swing for the fences." The club wanted to sign two strikers in the January transfer window and were at the "top of the list." The attention was on clubs in the Premier League and Serie A. Jermain Defoe, Alberto Gilardino Samuel Eto'o and Fabio Quagliarella were rumoured to join Toronto FC. The club denied the report about signing Defoe, but Bezbatchenko stated that "it's obvious the public "knows" who the targets are." Bezbatchenko also stated that "We've identified 3–5 (potential Designated Players) that would fit the role" and that "We're really  on two." Another name in the media was Gilberto. Toronto FC was in competition with clubs in La Liga, Liga MX, Serie A, and Bundesliga for Gilberto's signature. Gilberto was in Toronto and was at the Toronto Raptors game on December 10. Gilberto signed for the club on December 14. Michael Bradley and Defoe joined Gilberto as designated players. Defoe joined Toronto on February 28. Defoe was part of a marketing campaign with the club. The club put together a television advertisement stating that it's a "bloody big deal" that Defoe is coming to Toronto FC. The ad was also online and had close to 60,000 views in a day. The ads were running on The Sports Network and Sportsnet with Toronto being the main focus of the marketing campaign. Even though MLSE was using Defoe in their marketing campaigns, British newspaper The Guardian stated "The money may be good but the club are woeful and playing in Canada may end the striker's World Cup hopes."

Transactions

In

Out

Pre–season

Review

Toronto Opened pre–season on January 24 and left for a training camp in Florida on January 27. The expectations are "sky high" coming into pre–season. During pre–season training camp in Florida, Toronto defeated D.C. United 1–0 before returning to Toronto on February 7. However, Toronto returned to Florida to play in the Walt Disney World Pro Soccer Classic in Orlando, Florida. During the tournament, Toronto lost to Columbus Crew 3–1, tied Orlando City 1–1, tied Philadelphia Union 0–0, lost to Fluminense FC U23 team 4–2. During pre–season, Bright Dike injured his leg and will be out for six months. Doneil Henry trained with West Ham United during West Ham United for two and a half weeks.

Pre–season results

Walt Disney World Pro Soccer Classic

Major League Soccer

Regular season

Review

March–April
Toronto faced Seattle Sounders FC on March 15 in their season opener after having a bye–week during the opening weekend in the Major League Soccer season. Toronto won the match 2–1. Jermain Defoe scored both goals for Toronto and Clint Dempsey scored for Seattle. Gilberto didn't travel with the team to Seattle due to an injury. Gilberto suffered a hip flexor injury during pre–season. Bright Dike is out long–term. Michael Bradley, Justin Morrow, Bradley Orr, and Álvaro Rey were "questionable" for the game. Bradley, Morrow, and Rey started the match and Orr came on as a substitute in the 65th minute. Doneil Henry started the match and made his 50th league appearance. Dempsey got a two-game suspension for "violent conduct" from an incident with Mark Bloom. Dempsey had hit Bloom in the groin. Toronto's first home game is against D.C. United on March 22. Toronto won 1–0 with a goal from Jermain Defoe. This is the first time that Toronto won the first two games of the season. Toronto faced Real Salt Lake on March 29. Real Salt Lake won 3–0 with goals from Álvaro Saborío (2 Goals) and Luis Gil. Jackson was suspended for the match.

Toronto starts April with a 2–0 win against the Columbus Crew on April 5. Steven Caldwell was suspended for the match.

May–June

July

August

Then Toronto tied Chicago Fire 2–2 on August 23. Bakary Soumaré (own goal) and Gilberto scored for Toronto and Robert Earnshaw and Quincy Amarikwa scored for Chicago. Steven Caldwell and Justin Morrow left the game injured. To finish off August, Toronto lost to New England Revolution 3–0 on August 30 with goals from Lee Nguyen, Kelyn Rowe, and Teal Bunbury. All three goals came off of turnovers. Toronto turned the ball over which led to Nguyen and Rowe scoring and the ball came off the referee after Michael Bradley tried "to swing the ball right sideline" which led to Bunbury's goal. The following day, head coach Ryan Nelsen and his assistants were fired. Greg Vanney became the new head coach.

September

Toronto started September with two games against the Philadelphia Union. In the first match, on September 3, Philadelphia won 1–0 with a goal from Conor Casey. Ashtone Morgan, who made his first appearance since the opening game of the season, was sent–off after "pulling down" Sébastien Le Toux while Le Toux was "on a breakaway." This was Greg Vanney's first match in–charge as head coach. In the second match, on September 6, Philadelphia won 2–0 with goals from Connor Casey and Andrew Wenger. The second match was Vanney's first home match since he became the new head coach. The loss to Philadelphia meant Philadelphia overtook Toronto in the Eastern Conference standings. Then, on September 13, Toronto tied Chicago Fire 1–1. Michael Bradley was critical of the referee after the match and was eventually fined an undisclosed amount for the comment. Then on September 21, Toronto defeated Chivas USA 3–0 with goals from Jackson, Luke Moore, and Gilberto.

Regular season results

Table

Conference

Overall

Results summary

Canadian Championship

Toronto FC opened their attempt to win the 2014 Canadian Championship against the Vancouver Whitecaps FC, due to the seeding procedure used for the Championship.

Canadian Championship results

Mid-season friendlies

Results

Statistics

Team record

Squad and statistics

|-
! colspan="10"| Players who left after the start of the season.

|}

Goals and assists 
Correct as of October 25, 2014

Clean sheets 
Correct as of October 25, 2014

Disciplinary record 
Correct as of October 25, 2014

References

External links
2014 Toronto FC season at Official Site

Toronto FC seasons
Toronto FC
Tor
Toronto FC